
{{Speciesbox
| name = Oriental cockroach
| image = Common Cockroach - Project Gutenberg eText 16410.png
| image_caption = A: FemaleB: MaleC: Side view of femaleD: Young male
| taxon = Blatta orientalis
| authority = Linnaeus, 1758
| synonyms =
}}

The oriental cockroach (Blatta orientalis), also known as the waterbug (as they live in damp areas) or black cockroaches (as their bodies are mostly dark), is a large species of cockroach, adult males being  and adult females being . It is dark brown or black in color and has a glossy body. The female has a somewhat different appearance from the male, appearing to be wingless at a casual glance, but is brachypterous, having non-functional wings just below her head. She has a wider body than the male. The male has long wings, which cover three quarters of the abdomen and are brown in color, and has a narrower body. Both of them are flightless. The female oriental cockroach looks somewhat similar to the Florida woods cockroach and may be mistaken for it. Originally endemic to the Crimean Peninsula and the region around the Black Sea and the Caspian Sea, its distribution is now cosmopolitan.

 Habitat 
Oriental cockroaches tend to travel somewhat more slowly than other species. Often called "waterbugs" since they prefer dark, moist places, they can generally be found around decaying organic matter, in bushes, under leaf groundcover, or under mulch, and in sewer pipes, drains, basements, porches, and other damp locations in and around human habitations where they may be major pests.

 Adaptation 
Female oriental cockroaches have vestigial tegmina (reduced fore wings) and males have longer tegmina. Oriental cockroaches are mainly nocturnal, and they can be elusive in that a casual inspection of an infested dwelling during the day may show no signs of roach activity.

 Life stages 
 Ootheca 
Signs of cockroaches are their oothecae, which are "egg cases". The blackish-brown oothecae are formed a day after mating, and are deposited typically a day or two after formation (but up to seven days later), in a sheltered area or attached to a substrate by oral secretion.

 Nymph and adult stages 
Like all cockroach species, the immature nymph lacks wings. The adult form is sexually dimorphic; the male has prominent wings, however the female is brachypterous, having very small non-functional wings. The female is shorter and wider than the male. 

 Relationship with humans 
Cockroaches transfer bacteria and viruses from their legs to food, dishes, utensils, and countertops and they are known to spread dysentery, E. coli, Salmonella, and food poisoning.

They are major household pests in parts of the Northwest, Midwest, and Southern United States. They can also be found in Europe, Israel, Australia, and South America.

 Pest control 
Oriental cockroaches can be harder to get rid of than other roaches. Although adults can be fairly easily killed by the application of residual insecticide, the insecticides can get washed away, allowing new nymphs to survive.

 Comparison of three common cockroaches 

 Notes 

 References 

 External links 

Oriental cockroach egg parasitoid on the UF / IFAS  Featured Creatures Web site.
Oriental Cockroach Fact Sheet from the National Pest Management Association with information on habits, habitat and health threats
Black and white photographs of top view of B. orientalis male and female specimens, from Smithsonian Miscellaneous Collections''.
Oriental Cockroach on the Orkin website

Cockroaches
Household pest insects
Cockroaches described in 1758
Taxa named by Carl Linnaeus